Hussain Arif (born 25 December 1968) is a Pakistani sprinter. He competed in the men's 200 metres at the 1992 Summer Olympics.

References

External links
 

1968 births
Living people
Athletes (track and field) at the 1992 Summer Olympics
Pakistani male sprinters
Olympic athletes of Pakistan
Place of birth missing (living people)
20th-century Pakistani people